Tribal Electric Supply Company (TESCO)  is an electric distribution company which supplies electricity to FATA (present-day Merged Tribal Districts), Pakistan.

See also

 List of electric supply companies in Pakistan

References

External links
 

Distribution companies of Pakistan
Economy of Peshawar
Government-owned companies of Pakistan